Reidar Dahl (27 October 1893 – 24 November 1977) was a Norwegian jurist and sports official. He was born in Halden. He chaired the sports club SFK Lyn in 1927 and 1930, and served as president of the Football Association of Norway from 1936 to 1949, and from 1953 to 1955. He was decorated Knight of the Order of the Polar Star, and was an honorary member of the Norwegian Actors' Equity Association.

References

1893 births
1977 deaths
People from Halden
Norwegian resistance members
Norwegian jurists
Norwegian sports executives and administrators
Knights of the Order of the Polar Star
20th-century Norwegian people